Frisinnad Tidskrift is a political magazine which has been in circulation since 1930 in Västerås, Sweden. The magazine is affiliated with the Liberal People's Party.

History and profile
Frisinnad Tidskrift was launched in 1930 to spread the messages of the Liberal People's Party. The founder was Waldemar Svensson who also edited the magazine for a long time. Erik Hjalmar Linder and Gunnar Edman were among the contributors during the 1940s and 1950s, and the magazine was published on a bimonthly basis in this period. The publisher of the magazine is Föreningen Frisinnad Tidskrift based in Västerås.

Frisinnad Tidskrift was first published in Ljungskile, but in the period 1959–1982 it was based in Stockholm. The headquarters of the magazine has been in Västerås since then.

References

External links
 

1930 establishments in Sweden
Bi-monthly magazines published in Sweden
Liberals (Sweden)
Magazines established in 1930
Magazines published in Stockholm
Mass media in Västerås
Political magazines published in Sweden
Swedish-language magazines